Florestine Perrault Collins (1895–1988) was an American professional photographer from New Orleans.

Collins is noted for having created photographs of African-American clients that "reflected pride, sophistication, and dignity." instead of racial stereotypes.

Life and career 
Born in Louisiana, Collins was one of six children.  She attended public school only until age six, when she was forced to drop out to help bring in family income.

In 1909, Collins began practicing photography at age 14 . Her subjects ranged from weddings, First Communions, and graduations to personal photographs of soldiers who had returned home. At the beginning of her career, Collins had to pass as a white woman to be able to assist photographers.

Collins eventually opened her own studio, catering to African-American families. She gained a loyal following and had success, due to both her photography and marketing skills.  Out of 101 African-American women who identified themselves as photographers in the 1920 U.S. Census, Collins was the only one listed in New Orleans.

She advertised in newspapers, playing up the sentimentality of a well-done photograph. Collins also included her photograph in the ads to appeal to customers who thought a female photographer might take better pictures of babies and children.

Collins' first husband, Eilert Bertrand, believed that women should not have careers and tried to restrain her public appearances.

Collins died in 1988.

Legacy 
According to the Encyclopedia of Louisiana, Collins' career "mirrored a complicated interplay of gender, racial and class expectations".

"The history of black liberation in the United States could be characterized as a struggle over images as much as it has also been a struggle over rights," according to bell hooks. Collins' photographs are representative of that. By taking pictures of black women and children in domestic settings, she challenged the pervasive stereotypes of the time about black women.

Collins was featured in the 2014 documentary, Through A Lens Darkly: Black Photographers and the Emergence of a People.

Collins' work was included in exhibitions in New Orleans in the late 1900s and early 2000s, such as Women Artists in
Louisiana, 1825–1965: A Place of Their Own, 

Collins is the subject of the 2013 book Picturing Black New Orleans: A Creole Photographer’s View of the Early Twentieth Century, by Arthé A. Anthony.

References

External links 
Visions of Early Rampart Street, The photographs of Florestine Perrault Collins

1895 births
1988 deaths
African-American photographers
20th-century American photographers
Artists from New Orleans
20th-century American women photographers
20th-century African-American women
20th-century African-American people
20th-century African-American artists
Photographers from Louisiana